Braunschweiger Turn- und Sportverein Eintracht von 1895 e.V., commonly known as Eintracht Braunschweig or BTSV, is a German football and sports club based in Braunschweig, Lower Saxony. The club was one of the founding members of the Bundesliga in 1963 and won the national title in 1967. The club plays in the 2. Bundesliga, the second tier of the German football league system.

Since 1923, Eintracht Braunschweig has played at the Eintracht-Stadion. The club shares a rivalry with fellow Lower Saxon side Hannover 96.

In addition to the football division, Eintracht has departments for several other sports, of which historically the field hockey department has been the most successful.

History

Foundation and early years
Eintracht Braunschweig was founded as the football and cricket club FuCC Eintracht 1895 in 1895, became FC Eintracht von 1895 in 1906, then SV Eintracht in 1920.

The team has a colorful history and it quickly became one of northern Germany's favorite sides. In 1900, Eintracht Braunschweig was among the founding members of the German Football Association (DFB). It enjoyed success early on, playing in the upper tier league, winning the Northern German championship in 1908 and 1913, and placing three players on the Germany national team by 1914. Under the Third Reich, the team played in the Gauliga Niedersachsen and managed two appearances in the national final rounds. In 1942–43, Eintracht Braunschweig went into the national championship play-offs as one of the main favourites. The team under manager Georg "Schorsch" Knöpfle had just won the newly formed Gauliga Südhannover-Braunschweig with a record of 17 wins and 1 draw in 18 games, scoring 146 goals in the process. After a convincing 5–1 win over Victoria Hamburg in the first round, the draw saw the club paired with the other big favorites for the title, Helmut Schön's Dresdner SC. Dresden won the game held in Dresden with 4–0 and subsequently went on to win the German championship with an undefeated season.

Post-war football

As part of the denazification of Germany after World War II, the British authorities dissolved all previously existing sports clubs in Braunschweig and demanded the creation of a single, united sports club for the city. As such, Eintracht Braunschweig was merged into the new club TSV Braunschweig on 2 November 1945. TSV Braunschweig finally took on the club's current name, Braunschweiger TSV Eintracht von 1895, on 1 April 1949.

The club continued to play in the top division – now the Oberliga Nord – after the war, with the exception of a single season (1952–53) spent in tier II. The side was touched by tragedy in 1949 when goalkeeper Gustav Fähland died of internal bleeding a few days after being injured during a game in a collision with a Werder Bremen striker. Another appearance in the final round of the national championship came in 1958.

Bundesliga football 1963 to 1985

Eintracht Braunschweig's consistently high standard of play and financial stability helped it to become one of the 16 teams selected out of a group of 46 applicants for play in the Bundesliga, the new federal professional league formed in 1963. Once again the side enjoyed early success, capturing the national title in the 1966–67 season under manager Helmuth Johannsen with solid defensive play. That championship team gave up only 27 goals against, which stood as a Bundesliga record until bettered by Werder Bremen in 1988. Another ten players joined the national side from the team, mostly through the 1960s and '70s.

The club was hit by tragedy again during the winter break of the 1968–69 season when forward Jürgen Moll, aged 29 at the time, and his wife died in a car accident. Two charity matches were played for the benefit of the Molls' children, the first featured West Germany's 1954 FIFA World Cup-winning squad in the line-up of the tournament's final, and the second saw a combined squad of Eintracht Braunschweig and rivals Hannover 96 take on a Bundesliga all-star team.

The club found itself embroiled in the Bundesliga scandal of 1971, but with a somewhat unusual twist. A number of players accepted payments totaling 40,000 DM – not to underperform and so lose or tie a game, but rather to put out an extra effort to win. Ultimately, two players were suspended and another ten were fined.

In 1973, in the face of some opposition from the league, Braunschweig became the first Bundesliga side to sport a sponsor logo on its jerseys – that of Wolfenbüttel-based liquor producer Jägermeister. The move paid the team 100,000 DM and introduced a new way of doing business to football that is worth millions today. Other clubs quickly followed suit. Braunschweig's game against Schalke 04 on 24 March 1973 became the first-ever Bundesliga match to feature a club having sponsorship on its jersey. Jägermeister continued to sponsor the club until 1987, although a later attempt to rename the team "Jägermeister Braunschweig" was finally refused by the DFB in 1983.

Eintracht Braunschweig just missed a second title in 1977 when it finished third, one point back of champion Borussia Mönchengladbach and just behind second-place finisher Schalke 04 on goal difference. The club made news after the season by signing 1974 World Cup winner Paul Breitner from Real Madrid for a transfer fee of 1.6 million DM. Breitner, however, did not fit into the team at all and was sold to Bayern Munich after just one season.

The side counted a casualty in the Cold War in the death of Lutz Eigendorf, who fled East Germany in 1979, where he played for Dynamo Berlin, to come to the west to play for 1. FC Kaiserslautern. Shortly after his transfer to Braunschweig in 1983, he died in a motor vehicle accident which was revealed in 2000 as the assassination of a "traitor" arranged by the Stasi, East Germany's secret police.

The club played in the Bundesliga through to the mid-1980s having been relegated just twice, playing in the second division in 1973–74 and again in 1980–81. During the club's run of 322 games in the Bundesliga from 1963 to 1973, it set a record that still stands by not seeing a single player red-carded. In 1984–85, Eintracht Braunschweig was relegated from the Bundesliga for the third time.

Decline

Since the 1985–86 season, the side has played at the tier II and III levels, with the exception of the 2013–14 season. In 1987, Braunschweig managed to set a mark even as they were demoted; it became the only team ever to have been relegated with a positive goal differential, with 52 goals for and 47 against. After having been stuck in the Regionalliga for most of the 1990s, Eintracht Braunschweig moved constantly between the 2. Bundesliga and the Regionalliga during the 2000s. At the end of the 2007–08 Regionalliga season, the club was facing a severe crisis, both financially and on the field: Eintracht was in serious danger of missing out on qualification for Germany's new nationwide third-tier league 3. Liga, which would have meant Braunschweig's first ever relegation to the fourth level of the German football league system.

Recent history
With new manager Torsten Lieberknecht, however, who had only taken over the job a few weeks before, Eintracht Braunschweig managed to qualify for the 3. Liga on the last matchday of the season. Moreover, under Lieberknecht and also newly appointed director of football Marc Arnold, the club continued to steadily improve throughout the next few seasons; a resurgence on and off the field that was widely recognized by the German media. In 2010–11, the team won promotion back into the 2. Bundesliga as champions of the 3. Liga. There, Eintracht Braunschweig re-established itself quickly, finishing the 2011–12 season comfortably mid-table. The 2012–13 season should prove even more successful: on the second matchday, Braunschweig took over a direct promotion spot and kept it for the rest of the season. On the 31st matchday, the club secured its return to the Bundesliga after 28 years in the second and third divisions with a 1–0 away win over FC Ingolstadt 04.

The team finished the 2013–14 Bundesliga season in 18th place and was therefore relegated again after one season in the top-flight. Eintracht Braunschweig had spent most of the season on a relegation spot, but had a chance to stay in the league until the last matchday. However, the club was officially relegated on 10 May 2014 after a 3–1 loss at 1899 Hoffenheim. Eintracht came close to a return to the Bundesliga in 2016–17: the club finished third in the 2. Bundesliga and qualified for the promotion play-off to the Bundesliga, but lost 2–0 on aggregate to VfL Wolfsburg to remain in the 2. Bundesliga.

On 13 May 2018, Eintracht Braunschweig were relegated to the 3. Liga after a 6–2 loss to Holstein Kiel.

Crest and colours

Colours
Traditionally, Eintracht Braunschweig plays its home games in the colours blue and yellow. Those colours are derived from the flag of the Duchy of Brunswick.

Crest
The club's crest contains a red lion on white ground. This symbol is derived from the coat of arms of the city of Braunschweig, which in turn is based on the insignia of Henry the Lion. The club badge went through various different versions during its history, most of the time however it consisted of a circular badge in blue and yellow, with a red lion on a white shield in the center of the circle.

In 1972–73, Eintracht Braunschweig scrapped the original crest and replaced it with a new design based on the logo of its sponsor, Jägermeister. This was initially done to circumvent the DFB's ban on shirt sponsors – a loophole in those rules allowed to club to put a very close looking symbol on their shirt as long as it was the club's official crest. In 1986, after Jägermeister stopped the sponsorship of the club, Eintracht Braunschweig adopted a new, diamond shaped logo containing the traditional red lion as well as the club's colours blue and yellow.

In 2011, the club members voted to return to the club's more traditional round crest. In March 2012, the club then presented the new version of the crest, which was adopted as the official logo at the start of the 2012–13 season. For the 2016–17 season, the club wore a special anniversary crest to commemorate the 50th anniversary of the club's 1966–67 Bundesliga title.

Stadium

Eintracht Braunschweig plays at the Eintracht-Stadion in Braunschweig, built in 1923. Currently the stadium has a capacity of ca. 25,000, during the 1960s it held up to 38,000 people. Before the construction of the Eintracht-Stadion, the club played its home games at Sportplatz an der Helmstedter Straße, which held 3,000 people.

Supporters

Despite spending recent years in the lower divisions, the club's fan support has remained strong: with 21,396 per game, Eintracht Braunschweig had the 24th-highest average attendance of any sports team in Germany during the 2011–12 season.

While friendly fan relations exist with 1. FC Magdeburg, Waldhof Mannheim, and Swiss club Basel, Eintracht Braunschweig has a strong rivalry with Hannover 96.

Because of Wolfsburg's immediate proximity to Braunschweig, journalists often report a rivalry with VfL Wolfsburg. Also matches between the two are often referred to as a derby. This is denied by the fans of Eintracht Braunschweig as well as the Fans of Hannover 96, who only consider their matches against each other as the only true Lower Saxony derby.

Recent seasons

Key

League history

Between 1904 and 1985, Eintracht Braunschweig spent all but three seasons in Germany's top division. Between 1985 and 2013, the club then alternated between the second and third level of the German league pyramid, before returning to the top flight for the first time in 28 years at the end of the 2012–13 season.

Honours
League
 Bundesliga:
Champions: 1966–67
 2. Bundesliga (II):2
Runners-up: 1980–81, 2012–13
 3. Liga (III):
Champions: 2010–11
 Regionalliga Nord (II):
Champions: 1973–74
 Amateuroberliga Niedersachsen-Ost (II):
Champions: 1952–53
 Regionalliga Nord (III):
Champions: 2004–05
 Amateur-Oberliga Nord (III):
Champions: 1987–88
2Includes 2. Bundesliga Nord (1974–81).

Regional
 Northern German championship:
Champions: 1907–08, 1912–13
 Gauliga Südhannover-Braunschweig:
Champions: 1942–43, 1943–44
 Südkreisliga/Bezirksliga Südhannover-Braunschweig/Oberliga Südhannover-Braunschweig:
Champions: 1923–24, 1924–25
 Duchy/Free State of Brunswick championship:1
Champions: 1904–05, 1905–06, 1906–07, 1907–08, 1908–09, 1909–10, 1910–11, 1911–12, 1912–13, 1915–16, 1916–17, 1917–18, 1919–20
 Lower Saxony Cup (Tiers III-V):
Winners: 2003–04, 2010–11
Runners-up: 1998–99, 2008–09

1No championship played in 1914 and 1915.

European record

1 Juventus beat Eintracht Braunschweig 1–0 in a play-off in Bern to reach the semi-finals.

2 Eintracht Braunschweig progressed to the second round on away goals.

Intertoto Cup record

Players

Current squad

Out on loan

Notable former players

The list includes players with at least 250 games or 50 goals for Eintracht Braunschweig's first team, as well as players with at least one cap for their country's national or Olympic football team. However, players who did not receive any of their caps while playing for Eintracht Braunschweig are only included if they made at least ten appearances for the club.

Staff

Current technical staff

Manager history
Caretaker managers in italics.

Notable former presidents
The list includes former presidents and chairmen of Eintracht Braunschweig who have their own Wikipedia article.

Records
 Home victory, Bundesliga: 6–0 v Rot-Weiss Essen, 21 May 1977/6–0 v VfB Stuttgart, 5 April 1975
 Away victory, Bundesliga: 7–1 v Arminia Bielefeld, 28 June 1972
 Home loss, Bundesliga: 0–6 v Borussia Mönchengladbach, 29 October 1977
 Away loss, Bundesliga: 0–10 v Borussia Mönchengladbach, 11 October 1984
 Most appearances, all competitions total: 563, Franz Merkhoffer 1968–1984
 Most appearances, Bundesliga: 419, Franz Merkhoffer 1968–1984
 Most goals scored, total: 116, Werner Thamm 1950–1962
 Most goals scored, Bundesliga: 84, Lothar Ulsaß 1964–1971
 Most goals scored, season, Bundesliga: 24, Wolfgang Frank, 1976–77
 Most goals scored, season, 2. Bundesliga: 30, Ronald Worm, 1980–81

Reserve and youth teams

Reserve team

Eintracht Braunschweig II, historically also referred to as Eintracht Braunschweig Amateure, currently plays in the tier six Landesliga Braunschweig. The team's current manager is Arndt Kutschke, the coach is Marcus Danner.

Honours
 German amateur championship:
Runners-up: 1970
 Amateuroberliga Niedersachsen-Ost (II):
Champions: 1956
Runners-up: 1955
 Amateurliga Niedersachsen, Staffel 4 (Braunschweig) (III):
Champions: 1954
 Lower Saxony championship:
Champions: 1970, 2000, 2002, 2010, 2013
Runners-up: 1985, 2005

Youth
The club's Under-19 and Under-17 teams play in the Under 19 Bundesliga and the Under 17 Bundesliga, respectively in the 2014–15 season. The club's youth academy is located at the Sportpark Kennel near Schloss Richmond.

Honours
 German Youth Cup:
Winners: 2017
Runners-up: 1992

Other sports
As a multi-sports club, Eintracht Braunschweig also has departments for athletics, basketball, chess, darts, field hockey, gymnastics, team handball, swimming and water polo, tennis and winter sports. The club was especially successful in athletics and swimming from the 1940s until the 1960s, with the club's athletes, among them the then-current 800 metres world record holder Rudolf Harbig, winning over 40 national championships during that period.

Field hockey

The field hockey department historically has been one of Eintracht Braunschweig's most successful sections. Eintracht's women's field hockey team has won numerous titles, mostly during the 1970s.

Honours
 Bundesliga:
Champions: 1965, 1969, 1974, 1975, 1976, 1978
Runners-up: 1964, 1977
 German women's championship (indoor):
Champions: 1973, 1974, 1975
Runners-up: 1970, 1978, 1983, 2003
 EuroHockey Club Champions Cup:
Runners-up: 1975, 1976, 1977

Notable players
The list includes current or former players of Eintracht Braunschweig who have won medals at major international tournaments, e.g. the Women's Hockey World Cup or the Summer Olympics.

Ice hockey
Eintracht Braunschweig's ice hockey department was founded in 1981. After years in the lower divisions, the team played its first and only season in Germany's second division, then named 1. Liga, in 1997–1998. In 2000 the ice hockey section became independent as Eintracht Braunschweig Eissport e.V., and eventually dissolved in 2003.

Basketball
Eintracht Braunschweig's basketball department was founded in 1956. The club's women's team currently plays in the 2. Damen-Basketball-Bundesliga, the second tier of women's basketball in Germany.

In popular culture
The German 2009 drama film 66/67: Fairplay Is Over tells the story of a group of Eintracht Braunschweig hooligans. The title is a reference to Eintracht's championship winning season 1966–67, as well as the name of the fictional supporters club the characters in the film belong to.

In 2008 the German jazz funk/hip hop band Jazzkantine produced a musical about Eintracht Braunschweig, titled Unser Eintracht, in cooperation with the Staatstheater Braunschweig.

Bibliography

References

External links

Official website of the hockey section
The Abseits Guide to German Soccer

 
Football clubs in Germany
Football clubs in Lower Saxony
Association football clubs established in 1895
Eintracht
Multi-sport clubs in Germany
Athletics clubs in Germany
Ice hockey teams in Germany
German handball clubs
Water polo clubs in Germany
Field hockey clubs in Germany
Field hockey clubs established in 1895
Women's basketball teams in Germany
Basketball teams established in 1956
1895 establishments in Germany
19th-century establishments in the Duchy of Brunswick
Organisations based in Braunschweig
Bundesliga clubs
2. Bundesliga clubs
3. Liga clubs